Linoma may refer to
 Dictyosperma - A monotypic genus of flowering plant in the palm family
 Linoma Lighthouse - A tourist attraction near Ashland, NE on the Platte River
 Linoma Software - A Secure Managed File Transfer software company located in Ashland, NE